Diego Sebastián Huesca Colmán (born 8 August 2000) is a Paraguayan–Spanish footballer who plays as a goalkeeper for Luqueño.

Career

Club career

Huesca started his career with the reserves of Spanish La Liga side Valencia. In 2019, he signed for FC Andorra in Andorra. In 2021, Huesca signed for Paraguayan club Luqueño. On 23 August 2021, he debuted for Luqueño during a 2-0 win over Olimpia (Asunción).

International career

He represented Paraguay at the 2017 FIFA U-17 World Cup.

References

External links

 

Paraguayan footballers
Living people
Spanish people of Paraguayan descent
Association football goalkeepers
2000 births
FC Andorra players
Sportivo Luqueño players
Paraguayan Primera División players
People from Encarnación, Paraguay
Paraguay youth international footballers
Paraguay under-20 international footballers